The 2018 City of Bradford Metropolitan District Council took place on 3 May 2018 to elect members of Bradford District Council in England. This was on the same day as other local elections. One councillor was elected in each ward for a four-year term so the councillors elected in 2018 last stood for election in 2014. Each ward is represented by three councillors, the election of which is staggered, so only one third of the councillors were elected in this election. Before the election there was a Labour majority and afterwards Labour had increased their majority.

Result

|-
| style="background-color: white;width: 3px" |  
| style="width: 130px" | Others
| style="text-align:right;" | 1
| style="text-align:right;" | 0
| style="text-align:right;" | 0
| style="text-align:right;" | 0
| style="text-align:right;" | 
| style="text-align:right;" | 0.0
| style="text-align:right;" | 0.6
| style="text-align:right;" | 773
| style="text-align:right;" | 0.4
|-

Before the election the composition of the council was:

After the election the composition of the council was:

Results by ward
Asterisk denotes the sitting councillor.

Baildon ward

Val Townend was the incumbent. The swing between Conservative & Labour was 0.2%. There were much bigger swings from the Liberal Democrats to both Conservatives (16.0%) & Labour (15.8%).

Bingley ward

David Heseltine was the incumbent. There was a swing of 5.3% from Conservative to Labour. UKIP did not stand this time but got 23.7% of the vote in 2014 so the biggest swings are from UKIP to Labour (20.4%) and Conservative (15.1%).

Bingley Rural ward

Mike Ellis was the incumbent. There was a 5.3% swing from Labour to Conservative. The biggest swing was 19.9% from UKIP to Conservative.

Bolton and Undercliffe ward

Rachel Sunderland was the incumbent for the Liberal Democrats & this ward was gained by Labour with a 7.7% swing.

Bowling and Barkerend ward

Rizwana Jamil was the incumbent for Labour and increased their majority with a 15.5% swing from the Liberal Democrats.

Bradford Moor ward

Mohammed Shafiq was the incumbent for Labour. There was a swing of 17.1% from the Liberal Democrats who were second in 2014 to Labour. The biggest swing was a swing of 25.3% from Liberal Democrat to Independent and the swing between Labour and the Independent candidate was 8.2% from Labour to the Independent.

City ward

Mohammed Azam was the incumbent for Labour. Respect was second in 2014 though they did not stand this time creating the largest swing of 12.1% between Respect and Labour. The Conservative party did not stand in this ward this time either, this being the only ward in Bradford where one of the four largest parties did not stand.

Clayton and Fairweather Green ward

The incumbent was Sinead Engel for Labour. There was a swing of 0.2% from Conservative to Labour. UKIP was second in 2014 with 27.1% of the vote but did not stand this time so there was a swing of 18.9% from UKIP to Labour which was the biggest swing.

Craven ward

The incumbent was Andrew Mallinson for the Conservatives who failed to get reselected by the local Conservative Party. Rebecca Whitaker gained selection instead. Whitaker had previously been a Silsden town councillor. The swing was 5.3% from Labour to Conservative however the 2014 election was complicated by the election of a second councillor at the same time. The councillor which won the second seat was Christopher Atkinson as an independent who failed to be re-elected in 2015. No independent stood this time so the swing expressed between Conservative and Independent would be 23.5% to the Conservatives.

Eccleshill ward

The incumbent was Geoff Reid for the Liberal Democrats. The swing was 1.1% from Labour to Liberal Democrat. The biggest swing was 7.9% from Green to Liberal Democrat.

Great Horton ward

The incumbent was Joanne Dodds for Labour. There was a swing of 11.2% from Conservative to Labour. UKIP & Respect both stood in 2014 but not this time with 16.3% and 4.6% of the vote respectively. The largest swing therefore was 18.3% from UKIP to Labour.

Heaton ward

Nussrat Mohammed was the incumbent for Labour. There was a swing of 21% from Green to Labour though that could also be expressed as a swing of 29.4% from the Peace party to Labour as The Peace party was second with 21.1% in 2014 but did not stand in 2018. The Peace party candidate in 2014 had been elected as a Labour councillor four years previously.

Idle and Thackley ward

The incumbent was Dominic Fear for the Liberal Democrats who stood down at this election. There was a swing of 2.8% from Liberal Democrat to Labour though the largest swing was 7.2% from Conservative to Labour.

Ilkley ward

The incumbent was Mike Gibbons for the Conservative party. There was a swing of 2.1% from Conservative to Labour. UKIP gained 6.7% in 2014 & did not stand this time so the largest swing was 5.2% from UKIP to Liberal Democrat.

Keighley Central ward

The incumbent was Abid Hussain for Labour. There was a swing of 5.5% from Conservative to Labour. UKIP did not stand this time but won 13.4% in 2014 so the biggest swing was 13.0% from UKIP to Labour.

Keighley East ward

The incumbent was Stephen Pullen for Labour who stood down at this election. There was a swing of 0.9% from Labour to Conservative. UKIP did not stand this time but won 24.7% in 2014 so the largest swings were 20.5% from UKIP to Labour & 19.6% from UKIP to Conservative. Respect also did not stand after winning 10.2% in 2014.

Keighley West ward

Brian Morris was the incumbent, having been elected for UKIP in 2014 and left the party to stand as an independent campaigning for the separation of Keighley, Ilkley & Shipley from Bradford in October 2016. There was no UKIP candidate this time so the swing from UKIP to Labour was 26.5%. If the swing is calculated comparing the vote for Morris as an Independent against the vote for Morris as a UKIP councillor it would be 20.3%.

Little Horton ward

The incumbent was Naveeda Ikram for Labour who resigned from Labour and the council in November 2017. She had been suspended by Labour in October 2015 after being accused of seeking care contracts for Nexus Assist and failing to declare an interest in the firm while a Councillor between November 2014 & August 2015. The jury was discharged for undisclosed reasons in Crown Court in December 2017 and she was acquitted in the Court of Appeal in March 2018. She had been the first British Pakistani woman to be elected to Bradford council in 2004 and the first Muslim woman to be a Lord Mayor in the UK in 2011. There was a 2.9% swing from Conservative to Labour. Respect were second place with 16.4% in 2014 so the largest swing was 13.0% from Respect to Labour.

Manningham ward

The incumbent was Shabir Hussain for Labour. There was a 7.8% swing from Conservative to Labour. In 2014 the second place party was Respect with 30.8% of the vote though they did not stand this time. The largest swing therefore was 26.3% from Respect to Labour.

Queensbury ward

The incumbent was Paul Cromie for the Queensbury Ward Independents. He won the seat for the BNP in 2006 and split from the BNP with his wife in 2011 forming the Queensbury Ward Independents. Cromie was re-elected under the Queensbury Ward Independent banner in 2014 but in 2018 he did not campaign with no leafleting or canvassing. Cromie later said he stood for re-election to keep people happy but he wanted to retire. There was a swing of 19.6% from Queensbury Ward Independents to Conservative but the biggest swing was 26.8% from UKIP to Conservative. Between Conservative & Labour the swing was 7.7% from Labour to Conservative.

Royds ward

The incumbent was Valerie Slater for Labour. Slater stood down at this election having been the Deputy Council Leader & Deputy Leader of the Bradford Labour Group. Slater had been Councillor for Royds since 2004. There was a swing of 1.9% from Conservative to Labour. The largest swing was 11.4% from UKIP to Labour.

Shipley ward

The incumbent was Hawarun Hussain for the Green Party. Hussain had been a Councillor for Shipley since 2004. There was a swing of 17.1% from Green to Labour.  UKIP did not stand this time having got almost 14% in 2014 so the biggest swing was 19.3% from UKIP to Labour.

Thornton and Allerton ward

The incumbent was Richard Dunbar for Labour. There was a swing of 12.6% from Conservative to Labour.

Toller ward

The incumbent was Imran Hussain who stood down as a Councillor at this election having been both Councillor and MP since his election as MP for Bradford East in 2015. There was a 13.0% swing from Labour to Conservative. Respect were second in 2014 with almost 11% of the vote so the biggest swing was 14.8% from Respect to Conservative.

Tong ward

The incumbent was Alan Wainwright for Labour. There was a swing of 0.5% from Labour to Conservative, both parties benefited from significant swings from UKIP, 16.7% to Labour & 16.2% to Conservative. The biggest swing was 19.7% from UKIP to Green.

Wharfedale ward

The swing was 2.0% from Conservative to Labour. Gerry Barker for Conservative was the incumbent. An independent was second with 24.7% in 2014 so there was a swing of 17.% from Independent to Conservative & the biggest swing was 19.1% from Independent to Labour.

Wibsey ward

There was a swing of 14.0% from UKIP to Labour as UKIP was second in 2014. There was a swing of 3.0% from Labour to Conservative and the biggest swing was 17.1% from UKIP to Conservative. Lynne Eleanor Smith won the ward for Labour in 2014 but she died in May 2016. Joanne Lisa Sharp won the ward for Labour in the subsequent by-election and was thus the incumbent.

Windhill and Wrose ward

The incumbent was Vanda Greenwood for Labour. There was a swing of 1.6% from Labour to Conservative. UKIP was second in 2014 with 28.5% so the swing was 20.4% from UKIP to Labour & the biggest swing was 22.0% from UKIP to Conservative.

Worth Valley ward

The incumbent was Glenn William Miller for the Conservatives who failed to gain reselection by the local Conservative party. The swing was 6.3% from Labour to Conservative. UKIP were second with 28.9% in 2014 but did not stand this time so the biggest swing was 25.5% from UKIP to Conservative.

Wyke ward

David Warburton for Labour was the incumbent. There was a 3.1% swing from Labour to Conservative. UKIP were second in 2014 with 32.8% so the swing was 20.6% from UKIP to Labour and the biggest swing was 23.7% from UKIP to Conservative.

See also
 Bradford local elections

References

2018 English local elections
2018
2010s in West Yorkshire